Slaughter of the Innocents may refer to:

 Slaughter of the Innocents (film), a 1993 thriller film
 Massacre of the Innocents, a biblical account of infanticide by Herod the Great
 Pavonia Massacre and Massacre at Corlears Hook, New Netherlands killings on February 25, 1643

See also
 Slaughter of the Innocent, a 1978 book by Hans Ruesch